Veloporphyrellus is a genus of fungi in the family Boletaceae. Species are characterized by having a pinkish to pinkish-gray hymenophore, a membrane-like partial veil that hangs from the cap margin, smooth spores, and a trichoderm-like cap cuticle. The genus, circumscribed in 1984, contains eight species.

References

Boletaceae
Boletales genera
Taxa named by Rolf Singer